Epacris decumbens  is a species of flowering plant in the heath family Ericaceae and is endemic to a restricted area of New South Wales. It is a straggling, low-lying shrub with hairy branchlets, elliptic to egg-shaped leaves, and tube-shaped, white flowers.

Description

Taxonomy
This species was first formally described in 1992 by Ian R.H. Telford who gave it the name Rupicola decumbens in the journal Telopea from specimens he collected with Michael Crisp, near Glen Davis in 1976. In 2015, Elizabeth Anne Brown changed the name to Epacris decumbens in Australian Systematic Botany. The specific epithet (decumbens) means "prostrate but with the tips rising upwards", referring to the habit of the plant.

Distribution and habitat
Epacris decumbens grows on sandstone clifs, ledges and rock crevices in the Glen Davis and Cudgegong River areas of New South Wales.

References

crassifolia
Ericales of Australia
Flora of New South Wales
Plants described in 1810
Taxa named by Robert Brown (botanist, born 1773)